is a Japanese sprint canoeist. At the 2012 Summer Olympics, he competed in the Men's K-1 200 metres and the men's K-2 200 m with Hiroki Watanabe.

References

Japanese male canoeists
1988 births
Living people
Olympic canoeists of Japan
Canoeists at the 2012 Summer Olympics
Canoeists at the 2020 Summer Olympics
Asian Games medalists in canoeing
Canoeists at the 2006 Asian Games
Canoeists at the 2010 Asian Games
Canoeists at the 2014 Asian Games
Canoeists at the 2018 Asian Games
Medalists at the 2010 Asian Games
Medalists at the 2014 Asian Games
Asian Games gold medalists for Japan
Sportspeople from Ishikawa Prefecture